A russet potato is a type of potato that is large, with dark brown skin and few eyes. The flesh is white, dry, soft, and mealy, and it is suitable for baking, mashing, and french fries. Russet potatoes are also known as Idaho potatoes in the United States.

Varieties

 Russet Burbank
 Norkotah Russet
 Frontier Russet
 Russet Nugget
 Centennial Russet
 Rio Grande Russett
 Silverton Russet
 Ranger Russet
 Umatilla Russet
 Butte Russet
 Alpine Russet
 Alturas Russet
 Arcadia Russet
 Blazer Russet
 Canela Russet
 Castle Russet
 Classic Russet
 Clearwater Russet
 Defender Russet
 Echo Russet
 Galena Russet
 Gem Russet
 GemStar Russet
 Highland Russet
 King Russet
 La Belle Russet
 Lemhi Russet
 Mountain Gem Russet
 Nooksack Russet
 Norgold Russet
 Owyhee Russet
 Payette Russet
 Pioneer Russet
 Pomerelle Russet
 Premier Russet
 Reveille Russet
 Rio Grand Russet
 Sage Russet
 Targhee Russet
 Teton Russet
 Vanguard Russet
 Western Russet

Origin
To improve the disease resistance of Irish potatoes, Luther Burbank selected the potato that became known as the Russet Burbank. It was not patented because plants such as potatoes propagated from tubers were not granted patents in the United States.

Use
Restaurants such as McDonald's use russet potatoes for their size, which produce long pieces suitable for french fries. As of 2009, "McDonald's top tuber is the Russet Burbank". The russet Burbank is more expensive than other potatoes, as it consumes more water and takes longer to mature, while it also requires large amounts of pesticides.

Varieties with high levels of starch, like russet potatoes, are well-suited to baking and mashing.

References

External links
 

Potato cultivars